Krasnoye is a rural locality (a selo) in the Krasninsky District of Smolensk Oblast, Russia. Population:

References

Notes

Sources

Rural localities in Smolensk Oblast